Satsuki Miura (born 16 June 1996) is a Japanese professional footballer who plays as a defender for WE League club Albirex Niigata Ladies.

Club career 
Miura made her WE League debut on 12 September 2021.

References 

Living people
1996 births
Women's association football defenders
WE League players
Japanese women's footballers
Association football people from Tokyo
Albirex Niigata Ladies players